Paul Kalkbrenner (born 11 June 1977) is a German musician, producer of electronic music and actor. Because he breaks down his tracks into elements that are reassembled onstage, Kalkbrenner is considered a live act, as opposed to a DJ. He is most known for his single "Sky and Sand", which sold over 200,000 copies, went platinum, and was highly charted in countries such as Belgium and Germany. He is also known for portraying the main character Ickarus in the movie Berlin Calling, written and directed by Hannes Stöhr, which ran for several years at Kino Central in Berlin.

Biography
Paul Kalkbrenner grew up in Lichtenberg, Berlin, which was deep in the eastern sector of the city before the Berlin Wall came down. At the time of the Reunification of Germany, Kalkbrenner was only thirteen years old. It was then that he began to play records to his peers at the youth clubs of Berlin, despite his 11 p.m. curfew set by his mother. He played together with his good friend Sascha Funke, who he met at his school and discovered that they both shared a common interest in techno. Greatly admiring the Underground Resistance from Detroit, both Kalkbrenner and Funke spent the years between 1992 and 1997 delving into record bins and familiarizing themselves with the best techno releases of the day. It was this and a radio show they listened to every Saturday (Rave Satellite) that led them to the techno scene. Meanwhile, at school, he learned to be a trumpet player and studied music theory. Kalkbrenner is a keen football fan and an avid supporter of FC Bayern Munich. After spending many long and sleepless nights on the dancefloors of E-Werk, Planet, and Walfisch, the dream was born to make music himself. In 1995, at the age of eighteen, Kalkbrenner worked for two years as a cutter in the television industry to fund the equipment he bought for production. During that time, Kalkbrenner and Funke lived together and began producing music on machines they both bought and borrowed. After getting into music production, it is then that Kalkbrenner decided he would like to only perform live with his own music.

Career

BPitch Control
Before Ellen Allien established BPitch Control as a record label, she was throwing BPitch parties all around Berlin. It was at one of her parties that Kalkbrenner and Funke met Allien. She came over to hear what they were working on, gave a few recommendations, and in 1999, Kalkbrenner released his first tracks as the Friedrichshain EP on BPitch Control under the name "Paul dB+." After releasing two albums, Superimpose (2001) and Zeit (2001), Kalkbrenner began to see album releases as his preferred format. His melodic sound, with its affinity for grand emotional gestures, obeyed the logic of the dancefloor, but his third album, Self (2004), introduced a narrative aesthetic. The track "Gebrünn Gebrünn", released one year later, became a crossover hit. Kalkbrenner released six albums and ten EPs with BPitch Control, until his amicable departure in 2008.

Berlin Calling

After his release Self (2004), Kalkbrenner was approached by Berlin-based film director and long time supporter of his work, Hannes Stöhr, with the proposition of creating the soundtrack for Stöhr's movie about a Berlin DJ during the 2000s. In the course of their exchange, Stöhr had the realization that Kalkbrenner would be the perfect choice as the film's star. Kalkbrenner accepted the offer and they decided to title the film Berlin Calling. In late 2006, he moved to Aix-en-Provence, South of France with Sascha Funke for six months to work on the soundtrack. The hit track off of the album, "Sky and Sand" was produced with the vocals of his own brother, Fritz Kalkbrenner. 2007 saw Kalkbrenner's return to Berlin, in order to film the movie. Although the film is fictitious, Kalkbrenner was able to relate to the film's main character, Ickarus who is mentally destroyed by the scene but still holds many amazing musical ideas inside his head. It is perhaps because of that correlation, that Kalkbrenner's first venture into acting was well executed and successful. Ickarus is also a representation of who Kalkbrenner did not want to become. After the movie's release in October 2008, the album went platinum with over 200,000 and the song "Sky and Sand" topped charts for weeks. The movie premiered at the Locarno International Film Festival in Switzerland and was well received, turning in a cult classic in Europe. It broke the record of longest run film in Germany, with over 145 weeks of continuous screenings at Kino Central in Berlin. In 2009, the movie was released on DVD.

Paul Kalkbrenner Music

In 2009, after receiving widespread acclaim for Berlin Calling – The Soundtrack (2008) album released on BPitch, Kalkbrenner decided that after ten years, it was time for him and the label to split ways. He believed that the label did not have what it took to support his artist growth, to propel him forward. Wanting to do his own thing, Kalkbrenner created Paul Kalkbrenner Musik as a platform for his own music. Kalkbrenner set out on a sold-out, intensive, twelve-city tour in 2010 that was filmed with the help of the team that created Berlin Calling, and released as Paul Kalkbrenner 2010 – A Live Documentary. Since the label was begun, it has seen the release of two albums. Icke Wieder (3 June 2011) which was heavily supported by DJs like Sasha, ranked number two in German music charts, and ultimately reached gold status with over 100,000 CDs sold. The tour for the album brought together over 125,000 fans. That same summer, Kalkbrenner came to Ibiza for the first time to speak at the International Music Summit and play at one of Ibiza's renowned clubs, Amnesia. On 25 August 2012, Kalkbrenner married Romanian DJ/producer Simina Grigoriu. On 30 November 2012, he has released the album Guten Tag. In February 2013, he began to tour to support the new album in Europe and the U.S. Guten Tag has topped the charts in Switzerland.

Florian Trilogy
In 2015, he announced the release of the "Florian Trilogy" of three related works as a warmup for his planned album titled 7, to be released on August 7, 2015. The music video first episode "Cloud Rider" was released on May 18, 2015. The lyrics and vocals are performed by D Train with You're the One for Me. Episode 2, called "Mothertrucker", was released on Jun 12, 2015. The third and final episode of the trilogy, "Feed your Head", was released on July 17, 2015. The lyrics for this song are from Jefferson Airplane with White Rabbit. Paul explains in this  article how the Florian episodes came to be. The episodes are set in America where techno was born. But it has been excluded for quite some time. The episodes explain how Florian eventually gets techno back to America, where it all started.

Back to the Future
In July 2016 Paul Kalkbrenner dropped a three-volume mix series that chronicled the arrival of techno in Berlin in the early 1990s. Entitled Back To the Future the project was part personal odyssey, part social history, documenting the birth of a musical moment that would forever change the landscape of Berlin, and contemporary dance music.
In producing the trilogy Kalkbrenner compiled a list of more than 5000 tunes from 1987–1993 on YouTube, taking the tracks off line and gradually reducing the list, then cutting and editing the chosen tracks, sometimes just snippets of a song, to fit the mixtapes. With over 65 tracks and three volumes, Kalkbrenner takes listeners back to the tunes he heard as a young boy listening to the East Berlin radio station DT64.
Those tracks were made available for free on social media and topped over 1,5 Mio downloads, gaining him some renowned press echo.
Rolling Stone wrote „Viral, techno history lesson", Billboard magazin described BACK TO THE FUTURE as "work of historical excavation".

Starting in April 2017 he will perform a series of BACK TO THE FUTURE shows in the spring in rather smaller venues throughout Europe. These events will see Kalkbrenner return to DJing, which, though he has only played live since 1998, was how he performed as a teenager in Berlin youth clubs and in the early part of his career. The European tour was sold out within a week.

Parts of Life
On 18 May 2018 Kalkbrenner released a new album called Parts of Life, that is his latest and 8th album overall. Parts of Life features 15 tracks named with the file numbers Kalkbrenner used during production. Its cover art is a painting from his uncle, Paul Eisel, depicting a collection of "unique personal objects". He revealed three tracks as a special premiere for launching his album (Part Three, Part Six and Part Eight).

Production and live set-up
Kalkbrenner uses software synthesizers, sequencer (Ableton Live) in combination with MIDI controllers, hardware synthesizers and drum machines for his live shows. It is a set up he feels comfortable with, and does not foresee changing. In the early days, for production, Kalkbrenner used a Roland sampler, Amiga 500, Amiga 4000 Turbo, DAT, Roland S-750, and EFX to name a few. Since 2001, however, he sold all his equipment and only uses Ableton Live for music production.

Family connection
Paul Kalkbrenner is a grandson of the East German artist Fritz Eisel and older brother of music producer Fritz Kalkbrenner.

Discography
(selective)

Albums

EPs

Soundtracks

Singles

Albums
 Superimpose (BPitch Control, 2001)
 Zeit (BPitch Control, 2001) 
 Self (BPitch Control, 2004)
 Icke Wieder (Paul Kalkbrenner Musik, 2011) 
 Guten Tag (Paul Kalkbrenner Musik, 2012)
 7 (Sony Music, 2015)
 Parts of Life (Columbia Records / Sony Music, 2018)

Compilation
 X (Paul Kalkbrenner Musik, 2014)

Soundtrack albums
 Berlin Calling: The Soundtrack (BPitch Control, 2008)
 Global Player Soundtrack (with Fritz Kalkbrenner et Florian Appl, Suol, 2013)

Mix album
 Maximalive (Minimaxa, 2005)

Remix album Reworks (BPitch Control, 2006)EPs and singles Friedrichshain [as Paul dB+] (BPitch Control, 1999) 
 Largesse [as Paul dB+] (Synaptic Waves, 1999) 
 Gigahertz [as Paul dB+] (Cadeaux, 2000)
 dB+ (BPitch Control 2000)
 Performance Mode [as Grenade] (Cadeaux, 2001)
 Chromo (BPitch Control, 2001)
 Brennt (BPitch Control, 2002)
 Steinbesser (BPitch Control, 2003)
 F.FWD (BPitch Control, 2003)
 Press On (BPitch Control, 2004)
 Tatü-Tata (BPitch Control, 2005) 
 Keule EP (BPitch Control, 2006)
 Altes Kamuffel (BPitch Control, 2007)
 Bingo Bongo (BPitch Control, 2008)
 Sky and Sand (with Fritz Kalkbrenner, BPitch Control, 2009)
 Das Gezabel (Paul Kalkbrenner Musik 2012)
 Der Stabsvörnern (Paul Kalkbrenner Musik, 2012)
 Der Buhold (Paul Kalkbrenner Musik, 2013)
 Cloud Rider (Sony Music, 2015)
 Mothertrucker (Sony Music, 2015)
 Feed Your Head (Sony Music, 2015)
 Part Eleven (Sony Music, 2018) 
 Part Three (Sony Music, 2018) 
 Part Fourteen (Sony Music, 2018) 
 Part Seven (Sony Music, 2018) 
 Part Four (Sony Music, 2018) 
 Part Twelve (Sony Music, 2018) 
 Part Two (Sony Music, 2018) 
 Part Ten (Sony Music, 2018) 
 Part Five (Sony Music, 2018) 
 Part Fifteen (Sony Music, 2018) 
 Part One (Sony Music, 2018) 
 Part Nine (Sony Music, 2018) 
 Part Thirteen (Sony Music, 2018) 
 Part Six (Sony Music, 2018) 
 Part Eight (Sony Music, 2018)
 No Goodbye (B1 Recordings, 2019)
 Parachute (B1 Recordings, 2020)
 Graf Zahl (B1 Recordings, 2021)Remixes'Ellen Allien "Dataromance" (BPitch Control 2001)
Lexy / Autotune "Shibuya Love" (Jakuza / Low Spirit 2001)
Die Raketen "The Sound für Zwischendurch" (Freundschaft Musik 2003)
Sasche Funke "Forms & Shapes" (BPitch Control 2003)
Agoria "Stereolove" (Different / PIAS 2004)
Lexy & K-Paul "Happy Zombies" (Low Spirit Recordings 2005)
Michel de Hey "Snert" (Hey! Records 2006)
Error Error "Your Everlasting Breath" (Italic 2006)
Ellen Allien & Apparat "Jet" (BPitch Control 2006)
Chordian "Closed Eyes" (Soniculture 2007)
Undo & Vicknoise "Submarino" (Factor City Records 2009)
Modeselektor "200007" (BPitch Control 2009)
Michel Cleis ft. Totó La Momposina "La Mezcla" (Strictly Rhythm 2009)
2raumwohnung "Wir Werden Sehen" (EMI 2009)
Stromae "Te Quiero" (Polystar Records 2010)
Fritz Kalkbrenner "Facing the Sun" (Suol 2010)
Moby "Wait for Me" (Little Idiot 2010)
Depeche Mode "Should Be Higher" (Miami Ad School Europe 2013)
Jefferson Airplane "White Rabbit" (Sony Music 2015)
Leonard Cohen "You Want It Darker" (Columbia Records 2016)
NTO "Invisible" (Chapau under exclusive licence to AllPoints 2021)
FilmographyBerlin Calling (2008)Paul Kalkbrenner 2010 – A Live Documentary'' (2010)

Awards

DJ Magazine Top 100 DJ

References

External links

 Official website
 Paul Kalkbrenner on Soundcloud
 Paul Kalkbrenner on Resident Advisor
 Paul Kalkbrenner on Discogs.com
 
 Paul Kalkbrenner on BPitch Control

1977 births
German electronic musicians
Musicians from Leipzig
Musicians from Berlin
Ableton Live users
Living people
German DJs
BPitch Control artists
Sony BMG artists
Electronic dance music DJs
Musical groups from Berlin